Bruce is an unincorporated community in Nicholas County, in the U.S. state of West Virginia.

History
A post office called Bruce was established in 1901, and remained in operation until 1958. Just who the namesake of Bruce was remains uncertain.

References

Unincorporated communities in Nicholas County, West Virginia
Unincorporated communities in West Virginia